The ancient Lumbini Garden that spreads over the 6 km2 area has been developed into a sanctuary for cranes in Nepal.

The ruins of the palace of Tilaurakot (ancient capital of the Sakya kingdom of Kapilavastu), where Siddhartha lived his first 29 years, are located 27 km west of Lumbini.

References

External links
 Lumbini Crane Sanctuary
 

Tourist attractions in Nepal
Nature conservation in Nepal
Rupandehi District
Gruidae